Jay & Silent Bob's Super Groovy Cartoon Movie! is a 2013 American adult animated comedy film written by Kevin Smith, directed (and co-animated) by Steve Stark, and produced by Jason Mewes and Jordan Monsanto. The film's script was adapted from the Bluntman And Chronic comic book story originally written by Smith as a companion piece to his 2001 film Jay and Silent Bob Strike Back.
And the seventh film in the View Askewniverse

Plot
After winning $10,000,000 from a scratchcard they bought at the Quick Stop, Jay & Silent Bob decide to become superheroes Bluntman and Chronic (a parody of Batman and Robin). They build a secret Fortress of Solitude beneath RST Video and acquire all the necessary gadgets and accessories to make them ideal crime-fighters. They also hire their own butler, Albert (a parody of Alfred Pennyworth).

Throughout their crime-fighting ordeals, they manage to accidentally create a few super-powered enemies of their own, who together form "The League of Shitters". The League of Shitters consists of Lipstick Lesbian, Dickhead, NewsGroup, Cocknocker, and the Diddler. While at a ceremony in which Bluntman and Chronic are to be awarded the key to the city of Red Bank, The League of Shitters attack the dynamic duo and knock them unconscious. They then attempt to infiltrate the "Bluntcave", resulting in the deaths of NewsGroup and Diddler (they are crushed by a wall that reveals the entrance to the hideout). Lipstick Lesbian mortally stabs Albert in the back and places Bluntman and Chronic into a giant bong that is slowly filling up with water. After leaving the heroes to die, the villains descend upon Red Bank, killing everyone in their path. Albert uses the last of his strength to free the heroes before dying.

Vowing to avenge Albert, Bluntman and Chronic fly to Red Bank in the Blunt Jet to save the city from The League of Shitters' mayhem. An epic fight ensues in which Bluntman subdues Dickhead by tricking him into entering a gay bar and Chronic kills Cocknocker with a broken beer bottle. Lipstick Lesbian draws a gun and attempts to shoot Bluntman and Chronic, but they are miraculously saved by a new heroine, Bluntgirl. Bluntgirl defeats Lipstick Lesbian single-handedly and begins to show romantic interest in Bluntman. Chronic is jealous and expresses his desire for anal sex. Bluntgirl agrees to this, however, she penetrates Chronic with a dildo, much to Chronic's distaste. Bluntgirl asks Bluntman if he's ever experienced anything of the like, to which he replies, "Yeah, when Ben Affleck played Daredevil.". During the credits, it is noted that "Jay and Silent Bob will return in Clerks III."

After the credits, Jay and Silent Bob are visited by Stan Lee, who wishes to speak to them about the "Avenger Initiative". Shortly after, they are all picked up by Doc Brown, who requests their help in getting back to the future.

Cast

 Jason Mewes as Jay / Chronic
 Kevin Smith as Silent Bob / Bluntman and himself 
 Eliza Dushku as Lipstick Lesbian
 Tara Strong as Cocknocker and Small Fry the Science Guy
 Ralph Garman as Dick Head and Doc Brown
 Neil Gaiman as Albert the Manservant
 Ben Gleib as NewsGroup
 Jon Lovitz as The Mad Scientist
 Jennifer Schwalbach as Blunt-Girl
 Ray William Johnson as Quick-Stop hipster
 Scott Mosier as The General and Quick-Stop hipster guy
 Ming Chen as Shower bully 1
 Bryan Johnson as Shower bully 2 and Travis the Comic-Hating Bully
 Walt Flanagan as Shower bully 3 and Giagra ad narrator
 Kevin Conroy as The Mayor of Red Bank
 Brian Faraldo as The Diddler
 Jensen Karp as Dick Head's doctor
 Steve Stark as NewsGroup's mother and Internet cafe waitress
 Brian O'Halloran as Dante Hicks
 Stan Lee as himself

Release
The official site was launched on March 1, 2013, complete with trailer (introduced by Smith & Mewes).

The film was shown as part of a touring show similar to how Kevin Smith released Red State in 2011. Every screening had a Q&A afterwards and a recording of the SModcast.com podcast Jay & Silent Bob Get Old. The tour started on April 20, 2013 in Atlanta and continued in America until October.  Three screenings were scheduled for England in July 2014.

The film was released on digital distribution and VOD in May 2014.  The film saw a physical release on DVD and Blu-ray in the UK by Signature Entertainment in 2014.  By 2015, Amazon sold the film in the US as a print-on-demand DVD with no extra features, while Kevin Smith's store Jay and Silent Bob's Secret Stash sold a retail version with the extra features.

On September 1, 2014, the film was released on Netflix.

References

External links
 
 

2013 films
2010s American animated films
2013 comedy films
2013 independent films
American adult animated films
American flash animated films
American animated science fiction films
American animated comedy films
American independent films
American films about cannabis
American animated superhero films
Films based on American comics
Films scored by James L. Venable
Phase 4 Films films
SModcast Pictures films
View Askewniverse films
2010s English-language films